Bryan Ritchie (born 6 December 1954) is a New Zealand cricketer. He played in seventeen first-class and seven List A matches for Canterbury from 1979 to 1982.

See also
 List of Canterbury representative cricketers

References

External links
 

1954 births
Living people
New Zealand cricketers
Canterbury cricketers
Cricketers from Christchurch